Fridolin von Senger und Etterlin (4 September 1891 – 9 January 1963) was a general in the army of Nazi Germany during World War II.

Biography
Fridolin Rudolph von Senger und Etterlin was born on 4 September 1891, in Waldshut near the Swiss border. In 1912, he became a Rhodes scholar at Oxford and acquired fluency in French and English. World War I interrupted his education in August 1914, and he was commissioned a lieutenant in the reserves. Senger remained in the postwar Reichswehr as a cavalry officer. Senger studied for two years at the Cavalry School in Hannover, spent four years with the cavalry inspectorate in Berlin, and by 1938 was promoted Colonel.

World War II
Senger took part in the Battle of France in 1940. In October 1942, he was given command of the 17th Panzer Division in Southern Russia. In June 1943, during the Battle of Sicily he was German Liaison Officer to the Italian 6th Army (General Alfredo Guzzoni), and commanded the German units on the island until 17 July 1943 when General Hans-Valentin Hube assumed control of all Axis troops on the island. In August 1943, Senger took command of the German forces on the islands of Sardinia and Corsica. He conducted the evacuation when the German positions became untenable. On 8 October 1943 he received the command of the XIV Panzer Corps in Italy.

During the Battle of Monte Cassino, Senger fought at the Gustav Line, which included Monte Cassino. The German position was only broken by the Allies in May 1944.

Later life
After the war he wrote his memoirs, entitled Krieg in Europa (War in Europe) (which were translated into English as Neither Fear nor Hope), and he continued to write on military matters and theory. He was invited to the Königswinter conferences by Lilo Milchsack. These annual conferences helped to heal the bad memories after the end of the Second World War. At the conference he worked with the politician Hans von Herwath, future German President Richard von Weizsäcker and other leading German decision makers as well as British politicians like Denis Healey, Richard Crossman and the journalist Robin Day.

In 1950, Senger was one of the authors of the Himmerod memorandum which addressed the issue of rearmament (Wiederbewaffnung) of the Federal Republic of Germany after World War II. Senger was introduced by B. H. Liddell Hart to the military historian Michael Howard. Howard, who had fought in Italy during the war, recalls him saying, "May I give you a word of advice? Next time you invade Italy, do not start at the bottom." He was the father of Bundeswehr General and military author Ferdinand Maria von Senger und Etterlin (1923–1987).

Works

Awards
 German Cross in Gold on 11 October 1943 as Generalleutnant and commander of the German Wehrmacht on Corsica
 Knight's Cross of the Iron Cross with Oak Leaves
 Knight's Cross on 8 February 1943 as Generalmajor and commander of the 17. Panzer-Division
 Oak Leaves on 5 April 1944 as General der Panzertruppe and commanding general XIV. Panzerkorps

Notes

References

 
 

1891 births
1963 deaths
German military writers
German untitled nobility
German Army personnel of World War I
Recipients of the clasp to the Iron Cross, 1st class
Generals of Panzer Troops
Recipients of the Gold German Cross
Recipients of the Knight's Cross of the Iron Cross with Oak Leaves
German Rhodes Scholars
People from the Kingdom of Württemberg
German male non-fiction writers
Himmerod meeting participants
Reichswehr personnel
German Army generals of World War II
People from Waldshut-Tiengen
Military personnel from Baden-Württemberg